Helen Gee was an Australian author, editor, conservationist and environmental activist.

She was also one of the founding members of the Tasmanian Wilderness Society.

She was author and editor of two important works in relation to conservation and environment in Tasmania - The South West Book, and Fight for the forests.

She had written a book for the Wilderness Society about the Franklin River and Franklin Dam.

She collaborated on other works, including a number of papers for the South West Tasmania Resources Survey.

She also was involved in the compilation of Tasmanian poetry in River of verse.

After her death Bob Brown gave a eulogy at a memorial event in Lindisfarne, Tasmania. Later another item from the pen of Geoff Law in Hobart appeared.

References

Australian women environmentalists
Australian conservationists
Tasmanian Wilderness Society
1950 births
2012 deaths
People from Launceston, Tasmania